Atomic layer etching is an emerging technique in semiconductor manufacture, in which a sequence alternating between self-limiting chemical modification steps which affect only the top atomic layers of the wafer, and etching steps which remove only the chemically-modified areas, allows the removal of individual atomic layers.  The standard example is etching of silicon by alternating reaction with chlorine and etching with argon ions.

This is a better-controlled process than reactive ion etching, though the issue with commercial use of it has been throughput; sophisticated gas handling is required, and removal rates of one atomic layer per second are around the state of the art.

The equivalent process for depositing material is atomic layer deposition (ALD). ALD is substantially more mature, having been used by Intel for high-κ dielectric layers since 2007 and in Finland in the fabrication of thin film electroluminescent devices since 1985.

References

External links 
 ECS-JSS focus journal on atomic layer etch
Overview of atomic layer etching in the semiconductor industry

Industrial processes
Chemical processes
Semiconductor device fabrication
Etching (microfabrication)